The Sarawak Championship was a golf tournament on the Asian Tour. It was first played in July 2018 at Damai Golf and Country Club in Sarawak, Malaysia. It was the first Asian Tour event to be played in Sarawak, although an Asian Development Tour event was held there each season from 2012 to 2017.

Winners

References

External links
Coverage on the Asian Tour's official site

Former Asian Tour events
Golf tournaments in Malaysia
Recurring sporting events established in 2018
2018 establishments in Malaysia